Craftsman is an album by American singer-songwriter Guy Clark, released in 1995. It is a 30-song double-CD collection that includes all of Clark's late-1970s and 1980s recordings for Warner Bros. Guy Clark, The South Coast of Texas, and Better Days. The album was reviewed as being a collection of "some of Clark's finest work", containing "tales of drifters, smuggles, old-fiddle players, wild-eyed girls in cowboy bars, life on the south coast of Texas, waitresses in cheap hotels, the joys of homegrown tomatoes, carpenters and lots of finely crafted, highly original love songs".

Track listing
All songs by Guy Clark unless otherwise noted.
 "Fool on the Roof" – 4:09
 "Fools for Each Other" – 4:15
 "Shade of All Greens" – 3:13
 "Voilà, An American Dream" – 3:46
 "One Paper Kid" (Walter Cowart) – 3:24
 "In the Jailhouse Now" (Jimmie Rodgers) – 3:47
 "Comfort and Crazy" – 3:06
 "Don't You Take It Too Bad" (Townes Van Zandt) – 4:02
 "The Houston Kid" – 3:59
 "Fool on the Roof" – 2:33
 "Who Do You Think You Are" – 3:24
 "Crystelle" – 3:02
 "New Cut Road" – 3:42
 "Rita Ballou " – 3:10
 "South Coast of Texas" – 3:45
 "Heartbroke" – 3:00
 "The Partner Nobody Chose" (Clark, Crowell) – 3:06
 "She's Crazy for Leavin'" (Clark, Crowell) – 2:52
 "Calf-Rope" – 2:33
 "Lone Star Hotel" – 3:20
 "Blowin' Like a Bandit" – 2:37
 "Better Days" – 3:00
 "Homegrown Tomatoes" – 2:56
 "Supply and Demand" – 3:12
 "Randall Knife" [1983 version] – 4:08
 "The Carpenter" – 3:11
 "Uncertain Texas" (Crowell, Dobson) – 2:25
 "No Deal" (Van Zandt) – 3:16
 "Tears" – 2:46
 "Fool in the Mirror" – 3:30

Personnel

 Byron Bach – cello
 Richard Bennett – concertina, acoustic guitar, electric guitar, lap steel guitar, slide guitar, triangle
 Lea Jane Berinati – background vocals
 David Briggs – clavinet, harpsichord, piano, electric piano
 Don Brooks – harmonica
 Tony Brown – keyboards
 Rosanne Cash – background vocals
 Guy Clark – lead vocals, acoustic guitar
 Rodney Crowell – acoustic guitar, background vocals
 Frank Davis – background vocals
 Hank DeVito – acoustic guitar, electric guitar, steel guitar
 Philip Donnelly – acoustic guitar, electric guitar
 Buddy Emmons – steel guitar, slide guitar
 Don Everly – background vocals
 Vince Gill – acoustic guitar, electric guitar, background vocals 
 Johnny Gimble – fiddle, mandolin
 Emory Gordy Jr. – bass guitar, acoustic guitar, mandolin, piano
 Glen D. Hardin – keyboards
 Jack Hicks – steel guitar, slide guitar
 Sharon Hicks – background vocals
 Wayne Jackson – flugelhorn
 Paul Kennerley – background vocals
 Jerry Kroon – drums
 Lawrence Lasson – violin
 Albert Lee – electric guitar, background vocals
 Larrie Londin – drums, percussion
 Farrell Morris – steel drums, percussion, shaker
 Gary Nicholson – acoustic guitar, electric guitar
 Kay Oslin – background vocals
 Gordon Payne – background vocals
 Mickey Raphael – harmonica
 Frank Rechard – electric guitar
 Lisa Silver – violin
 Ricky Skaggs – fiddle, background vocals
 Bee Spears – bass guitar
 Buck White – mandolin
 Cheryl White – background vocals
 Kris Wilkinson – viola
 Larry Willoughby – background vocals
 Stephanie Woolf – viola
 Reggie Young – electric guitar

References

Guy Clark compilation albums
1995 compilation albums
Rounder Records compilation albums